The 1904–05 Football League season was Aston Villa's 17th season in the First Division, the top flight of English football at the time. The season fell in what was to be called Villa's golden era.

During the season Howard Spencer and  Joe Bache  shared the captaincy of the club.

Events surrounding the February 1905 match away to Small Heath highlighted their Coventry Road ground's inadequacies. The official attendance was given as 28,000, though with the gates closed before kick-off, thousands scaled walls or forced entrances in order to gain admission, and the actual attendance was estimated at anything up to 35,000.

Aston Villa won the FA Cup competition for the fourth time, beating Newcastle United 2–0 in the final at Crystal Palace, through two goals scored by Harry Hampton. The man of the match was Aston Villa's prolific scorer Billy Garraty,  great-great grandfather of footballer Jack Grealish, who was born only a few miles from the now Villa Park.

Also known as "The Wellington Whirlwind," Hampton played as a centre forward for Aston Villa from 1904 to 1920. He scored both goals against Newcastle United in the 1905 FA Cup Final. Hampton was a prolific goalscorer.

Football League

First team squad
  Billy George, 39 appearances, conceded 46
  Billy Brawn, 37 appearances
  Joe Bache, 37 appearances
  Billy Garraty, 37 appearances
  Alex Leake, 36 appearances
  Freddie Miles, 35 appearances
  Joe Pearson, 31 appearances
   Jack Windmill, 30 appearances
  Harry Hampton, 28 appearances
  Albert Hall, 28 appearances
  Howard Spencer, 24 appearances
  Albert Wilkes, 10 appearances
  Billy Matthews, 7 appearances
  Alf Wood, 6 appearances
  Willie Clarke, 5 appearances
  Albert Evans, 5 appearances
  Micky Noon, 5 appearances
  George Johnson, 3 appearances
 Harry Cooch, 1 appearance, conceded 2
  Mart Watkins, 1 appearance 
 Josiah Gray, 7 appearances
 Walter Brown, 11 appearances
 Jimmy Cantrell, 3 appearances
 Watty Corbett, 1 appearance

References

Aston Villa F.C. seasons
Aston Villa